The Eğirdir marinka (Schizothorax prophylax) is a species of cyprinid fish in the genus Schizothorax. It is endemic to Lake Eğirdir in Turkey.

References 

Schizothorax
Fish described in 1933
Taxa named by Viktor Pietschmann